Rachel is a census-designated place (CDP) in Lincoln County, Nevada, United States. As of the 2020 census, it had a population of 48. As the closest settlement to the Nellis Air Force Range and Area 51, Rachel enjoys a modest celebrity status, particularly among aviation enthusiasts and UFO hunters.

Overview
The tiny town receives a substantial number of visitors and tourists, catered to by a small tourist shop, a 12-room motel, and an alien-themed restaurant and bar, the Little A'Le'Inn.

Several unpaved roads near Rachel lead from Highway 375 to the boundary of Area 51.

Rachel's resident population generally numbers around 50, with some of them involved in ranching. Most of the year-round inhabitants live in mobile homes. Rachel has never had a post office. North of the town is the Quinn Canyon Range that has the ghost town of Adaven.

History

Early years
Rachel was founded in May 1973 by a local alfalfa farmer named D.C. Day. The community was first known as Tempiute Village, and then later as Sand Springs.

On February 15, 1978, the town was renamed to Rachel after the first baby born in the valley, Rachel Jones (1978–1980). Rachel Jones died on May 24, 1980. In memory of her, Rachel residents created a cemetery and memorial park. Rachel Jones was not buried at Rachel Cemetery.

Electricity arrived in Rachel on March 22, 1978, supplied to the Penoyer Valley by the Penoyer Valley Electric Cooperative.

In 1980, the Rachel Baptist Mission, Rachel's only church, began service in a donated mobile home. Since then, a part-time pastor has come to Rachel for religious services every Sunday morning.

Mid-air collision
On July 10, 1986, at about 4:10 pm, two F-16s of the Norwegian Air Force collided in mid-air while participating in Red Flag exercises near Rachel. One of them crashed within Rachel, only  from the edge of a mobile home park. The pilot of the downed fighter had ejected safely before the crash, and the other F-16 made it back to Nellis Air Force Base. The pilot of the downed F-16 suffered only minor injuries, and was transported from the crash site within 20 minutes of the incident by a U.S. Air Force helicopter.

Recent events
In 1995, the Rachel Baptist Mission moved into a permanent building at the same site that it had occupied previously.

In 2006, KFC created a giant company logo on the ground at the north edge of Rachel and claimed it to be the first logo visible from space. The logo also had a hidden message on the tie area of the logo that featured an impostor colonel holding a sign over his head, reading "Finger Lickin' Good". The logo was removed in mid-2007.

Rachel was featured in an episode of Louis Theroux's Weird Weekends which covered the UFO subculture. Rachel was mentioned in a two-part episode of The X-Files entitled "Dreamland", in which a secret agent aware of the hidden backstory of the show, played by Michael McKean, resided in the town and in which it is portrayed as much larger, and more suburban than it is in reality. It is also a key place in the first-person shooter game BlackSite: Area 51.

In 1996 the producers of the movie Independence Day, gave the town a time capsule, which is installed near the inn and is intended to be opened in 2050.

Beginning September 19, 2019, the day before the Area 51 Raid people were reported showing up and camping around Rachel in preparation for the raid. 

Alien Cowpoke Gas Station and General Store opened in Oct. 2020 and a planned campground and RV hookup ready to open by Fall 2021.

Demographics

As of the census of 2010, there were 54 people, 32 households, and 14 families residing in the CDP. The racial makeup was 94.44% White, 3.70% Asian, and 1.85% from other races. 11.11% were Hispanic or Latino of any race.

Of the 32 households, 6.25% had children under the age of 18, 25.00% were married couples, 6.25% had a male householder with no wife present, and 12.50% had a female householder with no husband present. 56.25% of households were made up of individuals, and 9.38% had someone living alone who was 65 years of age or older. The average household size was 1.69 and the average family size was 2.50.

In the CDP, the population was spread out, with 16.67% ages 15 to 24, 59.26% ages 35 to 64, and 24.07% aged 65 and over. The median age was 52.5 years. 59.26% of the residents were male, and 40.74% were female.

Climate
Rachel has a cold desert climate (Köppen climate classification BWk), with cold winters, warm summers and a high diurnal temperature variation.

Rachel receives  of precipitation, with the climate being consistently dry like the rest of the Great Basin. July, the wettest month, receives  of rainfall on average. September, the driest month, receives  of rainfall on average. Rachel receives a few inches of snowfall every winter.

Economy
While a local tungsten mine was operative, the community numbered over 500 inhabitants, but after the mine's closing in 1988, the population rapidly dwindled.

D.C. Day, Rachel's founder, died on July 25, 1997. Fay Day, his widow, died on March 13, 2011. She was buried in the Rachel Cemetery on March 19, 2011.

The Area 51 Research Center, a small UFO souvenir shop, closed in the fall of 2001. It has since re-opened in a corner of the Little A'Le'Inn. The community's only gas station went out of business in the winter of 2006–07, shortly after being acquired by a new owner, an investor from California. The gas station later reopened with gas and a store under the name Alien Cowpoke in October 2020.

The Little A'Le'Inn
The Little A'Le'Inn, previously the Rachel Bar and Grill, is a small bar, restaurant and motel located in Rachel, along the Extraterrestrial Highway. The business has been running for over 20 years and is frequented by visitors to the local Area 51. The business has a variety of Area 51 and UFO related merchandise for sale such as maps of the area, posters, postcards, and toys, and offers an "Alien Burger".

The inn opened circa 1989. The original owners were Joe (now deceased) and Pat Travis. In 1991 Joe and Pat wanted something unique for the Bar and Grill because they felt that "Joe and Pat's" was not exciting (according to patron Bruce Hooker). They held a contest won by Bruce Hooker with "A'le'Inn" (a play on "alien"). The current owners of the Little A'Le'Inn are Pat and her daughter Connie.

In popular culture
In Grand Theft Auto: San Andreas, the Little A'Le'Inn is referenced. It can be found in Bone County, San Andreas in the vicinity of Area 69, the game's parallel to Area 51, using the name "Lil' Probe'Inn".

References

External links

Official website
Lincoln County Chamber of Commerce
Map of roads to Area 51

Census-designated places in Lincoln County, Nevada
Census-designated places in Nevada
UFO culture in the United States
Populated places established in 1973
1973 establishments in Nevada
Restaurants in Nevada
Hotels in Nevada